Lechea racemulosa, common name Illinois pinweed, is a perennial plant native to the United States.

Conservation status in the United States
It is listed as a special concern and believed extirpated in Connecticut,    as endangered in Indiana and rare in New York State.

References

Cistaceae
Flora of the United States